James Hulme Canfield (March 18, 1847 – March 29, 1909), born in Delaware, Ohio, the son of Rev. E. H. and Martha (Hulme) Canfield, was the fourth president of Ohio State University.

Raised in New York City, Canfield attended Williams College and read law in Jackson, Michigan, before briefly practicing in St. Joseph, Michigan. He was on the faculty of the University of Kansas, teaching broadly in the humanities, until moving to the University of Nebraska, where he was chancellor. In 1895 Canfield returned to Ohio to become president of Ohio State University. He resigned the position in 1899 and became chief librarian at Columbia University, where remained until his death. Hulme was also a founding member of the American Library Institute.

He received the honorary degree Doctor of Letters (D.Litt.) from the University of Oxford in October 1902, in connection with the tercentenary of the Bodleian Library.

He married Flavia Camp on June 24, 1873; their children included Dorothy Canfield Fisher.

Canfield Hall dormitory at Ohio State is named in his honor, as is the Canfield Administration Building at the University of Nebraska.

References

Further reading
Past Presidents of the Ohio State University
Canfield Hall dormitory at Ohio State University

External links

James Canfield papers Catalogue entry at Williams College Archives & Special Collections

1847 births
1909 deaths
Presidents of Ohio State University
People from Delaware, Ohio
Williams College alumni
American lawyers admitted to the practice of law by reading law
Chancellors of the University of Nebraska-Lincoln
Columbia University librarians